Horrorscope is the fifth studio album by thrash metal band Overkill, released on September 3, 1991 through Atlantic and Megaforce Records. It was the first Overkill album to feature the duo of guitarists Merritt Gant and Rob Cannavino, and the last to be released through Megaforce, although they remained on Atlantic until 1995. Like its predecessor, The Years of Decay (1989), Horrorscope was produced by Terry Date.

Overview 
Following the departure of longtime guitarist and songwriter Bobby Gustafson, who left or was fired from the band amid a feud with its founding members Bobby "Blitz" Ellsworth (vocals) and D. D. Verni (bass), Overkill added two new guitarists in Cannavino (who had been Gustafson's guitar technician) and Gant (previously from thrash metal band Faith or Fear). Drummer Sid Falck left the band during the Horrorscope tour in 1992, and was replaced by former M.O.D. drummer Tim Mallare.

Reception 

AllMusic's Eduardo Rivadavia gave Horrorscope a positive review, awarding it 4.5 stars out of five and stating, "The insecurity felt among Overkill fans by the departure of founding guitarist and key songwriter Bobby Gustafson in 1990 ultimately proved unfounded when the New York thrashers' expanded two-guitar lineup—featuring Rob Cannavino and Merritt Gant—arguably delivered the finest effort of the group's career in 1991's Horrorscope."

The album reached No. 29 on the U.S. Billboard Heatseekers chart and as of 2010 remains Overkill's best-selling album of the Nielsen SoundScan era, having sold over 120,000 copies in the U.S. Promo singles were released for "Coma" and "Infectious", while the cover version of "Frankenstein" got airplay on modern rock stations, most notably on KNAC-FM in Los Angeles. Despite never being released as singles, there were music videos for "Horrorscope" and "Thanx for Nothin'", both of which received airplay on MTV's Headbangers Ball.

Track listing

Personnel 
Bobby "Blitz" Ellsworth – lead vocals
D.D. Verni – bass, backing vocals
Merritt Gant – guitars, backing vocals
Rob Cannavino – guitars, backing vocals
Sid Falck – drums

Additional personnel
Bobby "Blitz" Ellsworth – production
Merritt Gant – production
Rob Cannavino – production
Terry Date – engineering, production
Matt Lane – engineering assistance
Howie Weinberg – mastering
Jon Zazula – executive producer
Marsha Zazula – executive producer

Charts

References 

Overkill (band) albums
1991 albums
Atlantic Records albums
Megaforce Records albums
Albums produced by Terry Date